Champneuf is a municipality in the Canadian province of Quebec, located in the Abitibi Regional County Municipality. It is the smallest incorporated place in terms of population in the Abitibi-Témiscamingue region.

History
In 1938, the settlement was founded, first called Colonie Bertrand, after its first parish priest Achille-Augustin Bertrand. In 1941, it was renamed to Champneufs (French for "new fields"), but also known by the parish name of Saint-François-d'Assise-de-Champneufs during the 1950s. At one point and for unknown reasons, the name was changed from the plural to the singular Champneuf. In 1964, the place was incorporated as a municipality.

Demographics
Population trend:
 Population in 2021: 94 (2016 to 2021 population change: -23.6%)
 Population in 2016: 123 
 Population in 2011: 127 
 Population in 2006: 130
 Population in 2001: 157
 Population in 1996: 169
 Population in 1991: 187

Private dwellings occupied by usual residents: 48 (total dwellings: 54)

Mother tongue:
 English as first language: 5.3%
 French as first language: 94.7%
 English and French as first language: 0%
 Other as first language: 0%

Municipal council
 Mayor: Rosaire Guénette
 Councillors: Manon Beaudet, Joseph Blais, Émile Bourassa, Léopold Leduc, Stéphane Leduc, Jean-Baptiste Rioux

Political representation 

Provincially it is part of the riding of Abitibi-Ouest. In the 2022 Quebec general election the incumbent MNA Suzanne Blais, of the Coalition Avenir Québec, was re-elected to represent the population of Champneuf in the National Assembly of Quebec.

Federally, Champneuf is part of the federal riding of Abitibi—Témiscamingue. In the 2021 Canadian federal election, the incumbent Sébastien Lemire of the Bloc Québécois was re-elected to represent the population Champneuf in the House of Commons of Canada.

Climate
Climate type is dominated by the winter season, a long, cold period with short, clear days, relatively little precipitation mostly in the form of snow, and low humidity.  The Köppen climate classification subtype for this climate is "Dfc"(Continental Subarctic Climate).

References

Municipalities in Quebec
Incorporated places in Abitibi-Témiscamingue